4 is the third studio album and fourth album overall by Mexican-American cumbia group A.B. Quintanilla y Los Kumbia Kings and the third studio album by Mexican-American musician A.B. Quintanilla. It was released on February 25, 2003 by EMI Latin. This album became their second number one album on the United States Billboard Top Latin Albums chart. "No Tengo Dinero" song by Juan Gabriel original version on Juan Gabriel's debut album El Alma Joven in 1971. The album received a nomination for a Latin Grammy Award for Best Pop Album by a Duo or Group with Vocals in 2003.

Track listing
This track listing from Billboard.com

Personnel
Adapted from Allmusic.

Kumbia Kings
 A.B. Quintanilla III – bass guitar, backing vocals, arranger, producer, executive producer, mixing, composer
 Jason "DJ Kane" Cano – vocals, arranger
 Francisco "Frankie J" Bautista Jr. – vocals, arranger
 Andrew "Drew" Maes – vocals
 Anthony "Nino B" López – backing vocals, dancer
 Juan Jesús "JP" Peña – backing vocals, dancer
 Cruz Martínez – keyboards, arranger, programming, producer, engineer, mixing, composer
 Chris Pérez – guitar
 Alex Ramírez – keyboards
 Roy "Slim" Ramírez – percussion, backing vocals
 Noe "Gipper" / "El Animal" Nieto Jr. – accordion
 Frankie Aranda – percussion
 Jesse "O'Jay" Martínez – drums

Additional musicians and production
 Rodney "Cortada" Alejandro – arranger
 Nicolas Barry – arranger, didjeridu, computers
 Robert Becker – viola
 Joel Derouin – violin
 Wil Donovan – studio assistant
 Erika Duke-Kirkpartick – cello
 Eric Flores – saxophone
 Juan Gabriel – vocals, rap (track 1)
 James Gálvez – arranger
 Humberto García – guitar
 Jesse García – guitar
 Emede González – trombone
 El Gran Silencio – vocals (track 1)
 Tony Hernández – vocals
 Cano Hernández – rap
 Isaac "Campo" Valdez – accordion
 Marcos Martínez – percussion
 Susan Jensen – violin
 Tomas Jacobi – amanuensis
 Peter Kent – violin
 Gina Kronstadt – violin
 Limi-T 21 – vocals (track 14)
 Maria Newman – viola
 Dusty "DJ Dus" Oliveira – DJ cuts and scratches
 Organized Rhymes – vocals (track 10)
 Ozomatli – vocals (track 7)
 Asdru Sierra – vocals, trumpet
 Raúl Pacheco – vocals, electric guitar, rhythm guitar
 Jiro Yamaguchi – conga, cymbals, tabla, güira, cowbell
 Justin "El Niño" Poree – cuíca, timbales, repinique
 Charles Paakkari – engineer
 Randy Stein – cello
 Aleks Syntek – vocals, keyboards (track 4)
 Jean Rosenberg – contractor
 Elvin F. Torres – producer, musical direction
 Roger Vera – trumpet
 John Wittenberg – violin

Chart performance

Sales and certifications

References

2003 albums
Kumbia Kings albums
A. B. Quintanilla albums
Albums produced by A.B. Quintanilla
Albums produced by Cruz Martínez
EMI Latin albums
Spanish-language albums
Cumbia albums
Albums recorded at Q-Productions